André António Ribeiro Novais, known as Nera (born 9 July 1988) is a Portuguese football player who plays as a defender.

Club career
He made his professional debut in the Segunda Liga for Famalicão on 23 November 2016 in a game against Benfica B.

References

1988 births
Sportspeople from Guimarães
Living people
Portuguese footballers
G.D. Serzedelo players
F.C. Tirsense players
GD Bragança players
F.C. Famalicão players
Liga Portugal 2 players
Association football defenders